= Taraisewaniya =

Tarasewaniya Tara Sewaniya
- village
- Location within Madhya Pradesh Location within India
- Coordinates: 23.3557232°N 77.303723°E
- Country: India
- State: Madhya Pradesh
- District: Bhopal
- Tehsil: Huzur
- Elevation: 511 m (1,677 ft)

Population (2011)
  - Total: 3,301
- Time zone: UTC+5:30 (IST)
- ISO 3166 code: MP-IN
- 2011 census code: 482356

Taraisewaniya is a village in the Bhopal district of Madhya Pradesh, India. It is located in the Huzur tehsil and the Phanda block.

== Demographics ==
According to the 2011 census of India, Taraisewaniya had 658 households. The effective literacy rate (i.e. the literacy rate of population excluding children aged 6 and below) was 64.99%.

Demographics (2011 Census)
	Total	Male	Female
Population	3,301	1,745	1,556
Children aged below 6 years	505	269	236
Scheduled caste	671	365	306
Scheduled tribe	232	132	100
Literates	1,817	1,106	711
Workers (all)	1,475	832	643
Main workers (total)	743	532	211
Main workers: Cultivators	264	213	51
Main workers: Agricultural labourers	409	272	137
Main workers: Household industry workers	12	10	2
Main workers: Other	58	37	21
Marginal workers (total)	732	300	432
Marginal workers: Cultivators	89	32	57
Marginal workers: Agricultural labourers	586	243	343
Marginal workers: Household industry workers	21	10	11
Marginal workers: Others	36	15	21
Non-workers	1,826	913	913
